Alexandrovka is a rural locality (a selo) in Kirzinsky Selsoviet, Karaidelsky District, Bashkortostan, Russia. The population was 41 as of 2010. There are 2 streets.

Geography 
Alexandrovka is located 81 km south of Karaidel (the district's administrative centre) by road. Tat-Kudash is the nearest rural locality.

References 

Rural localities in Karaidelsky District